S. D. Chrostowska is an American-Canadian writer and intellectual historian of modern critical thought. She holds a professorship in 20th century continental thought at York University in Canada.

Research 
Sylwia Dominika Chrostowska, born to Polish parents and raised in Poland at the end of the Cold War, completed her PhD at the University of Toronto at the Centre for Comparative Literature under the supervision of historian Brian Stock. In 2014-2016 she was an Alexander von Humboldt Foundation fellow based at Humboldt University in Berlin.

Chrostowska's academic work is principally in the history of social and literary criticism (18th-20th century Europe). She writes mainly on Frankfurt School Critical Theory, and on the critical dimension of utopianism and nostalgia. Her first book, Literature on Trial (2012), examined the rise of modern literary criticism in connection with the development of literature as a separate domain.

Chrostowska also writes cultural criticism spanning academic and nonacademic genres. Matches (2015), her wide-ranging collection of philosophical, critical, and literary fragments, was anthologized in Short Circuits: Aphorisms, Fragments, and Literary Anomalies (Schaffer Press, 2018). In 2018 Noxious Sector Press released Something Other than Lifedeath, a book of articles focusing on her work and edited by David Cechetto.

Fiction 
Chrostowska's epistolary novel Permission is composed of anonymous messages sent to a well-known filmmaker and includes black and white images. Quill & Quire called it "one of the most intellectually bracing, technically fascinating Canadian-authored novels" of 2013.

Her second novel, The Eyelid, is a critical dystopia set in near-future Paris, the capital of the world state of Greater America, and tells the story of two travelers through other people's dreams on a quest to save humanity from total insomniac dreamlessness. The book was the Editor's Choice at Quill & Quire, which praised its rare ambition and its dramatisation of the individual mind's subversive ability "to dream itself into a better existence." The Toronto Stars Alex Good chose it as one of the four best new science-fiction titles. According to German Sierra at Full Stop, the novella "might well become an instant cult book until it makes its way to a much deserved place at the top of any list of utopian-dystopian fiction masterworks." Its unique blend of narrative and social critique stages a dialectical confrontation, typical of the novel of ideas, between dystopian and utopian currents in contemporary capitalist societies.

 Books 
 Utopia in the Age of Survival: Between Myth and Politics (Stanford: Stanford University Press, 2021)
 A Cage for Every Child (Seattle: Sublunary, 2021)
 The Eyelid (Toronto: Coach House Books, 2020)
 Matches: A Light Book, 2nd expanded edition, foreword by Alexander Kluge (Punctum Books, 2019)
 Literature on Trial: The Emergence of Critical Discourse in Germany, Poland, and Russia, 1700-1800 (Toronto: University of Toronto Press, 2012)
 Permission: A Novel (Urbana-Champaign, IL: Dalkey Archive Press, 2013)
 Matches: A Light Book (Brooklyn, NY: punctum books, 2015)
 Political Uses of Utopia: New Marxist, Anarchist, and Radical Democratic Perspectives, coedited with James D. Ingram (New York, NY: Columbia University Press, 2017)In French'''
 Feux croisés: Propos sur l'histoire de la survie.'' Préfacé par Alexander Kluge. Traduit par Joël Gayraud (Paris, Klincksieck, 2019)

References 

Year of birth missing (living people)
Living people
University of Toronto alumni
Academic staff of York University
21st-century American novelists
21st-century American short story writers
21st-century American women writers
American women novelists
21st-century Canadian novelists
21st-century Canadian short story writers
21st-century Canadian historians
Canadian women historians
Canadian women novelists
Canadian women short story writers
21st-century Canadian women writers
American women academics